Jere Tolton (December 9, 1937 – January 24, 2009) was an American judge and politician. He served as a Democratic member for the 6th district of the Florida House of Representatives.

Life and career 
Tolton attended Washington and Lee University School of Law. He was a newspaper reporter.

In 1972, Tolton was elected to the 6th district of the Florida House of Representatives, succeeding Henton D. Elmore. He served until 1976, when he was succeeded by James G. Ward. In the same year, Tolton was appointed by Florida Governor Reubin Askew to serve a circuit court judge for Florida's First Judicial Court, serving until 2007.

Tolton died in January 2009, at the age of 71.

References 

1937 births
2009 deaths
Democratic Party members of the Florida House of Representatives
20th-century American politicians
Florida state court judges
20th-century American judges
Washington and Lee University School of Law alumni